Nana Arhin Duah (born September 14, 1980) is a Ghanaian football striker, who last played for Ashanti Gold SC.

Career
Duah began his career in Ashanti Gold SC. In 1997 the team won the CAF Champions League. He moved after 3 years in January 2000 to Asante Kotoko.

In the season 2007/08 he was champion with Asante Kotoko and he won the President's Cup with his team. He scored for Kotoko in their second MTN CAF Champions League Group A match against CS Sfaxien a goal.

After eight years with Asante Kotoko turned back to his youth club and signed on 24 October 2008 a three years contract with Ashanti Gold SC, he left the team on 26 April 2009.

International
Played in Ghana's 2006 World Cup preliminary qualifier against Somalia, scoring two goals, but did not feature much for Ghana subsequently.

Honors
Runner up 1997: CAF Champions League

References

External links
 

1980 births
Living people
Ghana international footballers
Ghanaian footballers
Asante Kotoko S.C. players
Ashanti Gold SC players
Association football forwards